CodeScene is a behavioral code analysis tool developed by Empear AB. CodeScene provides code visualizations based on version-control data and machine learning algorithms that identify social patterns and hidden risks in code.

CodeScene detects hotspots—complex code that an organization has to work with frequently—and prioritizes technical debt based on how the developers work with the code.

History 

CodeScene is based on the ideas from the book Your Code As A Crime Scene: Use Forensic Techniques to Arrest Defects, Bottlenecks, and Bad Design in Your Programs  by Empear's founder Adam Tornhill.

The first version of CodeScene was released in 2016, and the current version is 4.0 which comes with  auto-generated PDF reports, architectural code health metrics, quality gates for build pipelines, and can put costs on hotspots.

In January of 2021, CodeScene raised  from Inventure and Luminar to expand its business.

Overview 

CodeScene includes support for the following programming languages:
C, C++, C#, Java, Groovy, JavaScript, TypeScript, Objective-C, Scala, Python, Swift, Go, Kotlin, Visual Basic .Net, PHP, Perl, Dart, Erlang and Ruby.

The Software as a service version of CodeScene is available for free for open source projects. CodeScene is also available in an on-premise version that includes more advanced features like continuous integration support, Jira integration for cost calculations, and on- and off-boarding simulations.

Reception 

CodeScene was featured on the ThoughtWorks Technology Radar as a social code analysis tool.

In a University of Victoria report, CodeScene was found to find more significant technical debt issues than SonarQube, a static analysis tool. 

CodeScene users report that CodeScene is "The right way to manage technical debt", "A new standard for quality assurance", and provides "Insights like never seen before".

CodeScene's free version is used to visualize the case studies in Adam Tornhill's book Software Design X-Rays: Fix Technical Debt with Behavioral Code Analysis.

References

External links 
 CodeScene
 CodeScene Cloud

Static program analysis tools